was a Japanese financier and statesman of the Taisho and Showa eras.  He was the 9th and 11th Governor of the Bank of Japan (BOJ).

Biography
Inoue was born in Ōita Prefecture.  A graduate of the Imperial University of Tokyo. In 1896, he entered the Bank of Japan.  In  1897, Inoue was a BOJ trainee along with Hisaakira Hijikata.  Both young men were sent by the bank to learn about British banking practices in London.  From 1913-1919, Inoue was head of the Yokohama Specie Bank Inoue was Governor of the Bank of Japan from March 13, 1919 – September 2, 1923 and again from May 10, 1927 – June 1, 1928. and Minister of Finance in 1923-1924 and 1929-1931. He briefly presided the Institute of Pacific Relations between Ray Lyman Wilbur nomination as United States Secretary of the Interior and his own second nomination as Japan Minister of Finances.

In 1932, Inoue was one of two prominent Japanese assassinated in the League of Blood Incident.

Notes

References
 Metzler, Mark. (2006). Lever of Empire: the International Gold Standard and the Crisis of Liberalism in Prewar Japan. Berkeley: University of California Press. ;  OCLC 469841628
 Tamaki, Norio. (1995). Japanese banking: a History, 1859-1959. Cambridge: Cambridge University Press. ;  OCLC 231677071

|-

1869 births
1932 deaths
Assassinated Japanese politicians
Ministers of Finance of Japan
Governors of the Bank of Japan
Japanese bankers
People from Ōita Prefecture
People murdered in Japan